Thomas James Donohue (born November 15, 1952) is an American former professional baseball player who played two seasons for the California Angels of Major League Baseball.

Donohue won the 1967 Senior League World Series with the Westbury Little League. He played college football at Idaho State as a tailback before transferring to Nassau Community College to play college baseball.

Donohue earned a degree in mortuary science at Farmingdale State College after the conclusion of his baseball career and became a funeral director.

References

References

Major League Baseball catchers
California Angels players
Baseball players from New York (state)
1952 births
Living people
El Paso Diablos players
Idaho Falls Angels players
Nassau Lions baseball players
Quad Cities Angels players
Salinas Packers players
Salt Lake City Gulls players
Sportspeople from Nassau County, New York
Idaho State Bengals football players
Farmingdale State College alumni
American funeral directors